Ivan Hakman (18 January 1955) is a former professional Soviet football defender and coach.

References

External links
 
 
 Bucovinian footballer Ivan Hakman celebrated his 60th Anniversary (Буковинський футболіст Іван Гакман відсвяткував 60 років). Pogliad. 20 January 2015

1955 births
Living people
Soviet footballers
SKA Lviv players
FC Bukovyna Chernivtsi players
FC Chornomorets Odesa players
SKA Odesa players
FC Krystal Kherson players
FC Krystal Chortkiv players
FC Lada Chernivtsi players
FC Dnister Zalishchyky players
FC Advis Khmelnytskyi players
CSF Bălți players
Soviet Top League players
Ukrainian football managers
FC Krystal Chortkiv managers
Association football defenders
Sportspeople from Chernivtsi